The 1952 Yale Bulldogs football team represented Yale University in the 1952 college football season.  The Bulldogs were led by first-year head coach Jordan Olivar, played their home games at the Yale Bowl and finished the season with a 7–2 record.

Schedule

References

Yale
Yale Bulldogs football seasons
Yale Bulldogs football